The Tyson Holly Farms 400 was a NASCAR Winston Cup Series stock car race held annually from 1949 to 1996 at the North Wilkesboro Speedway in Wilkes County, North Carolina. It was the second of two Winston Cup Series races held annually (with the springtime First Union 400) at North Wilkesboro Speedway before the track was abandoned in 1996. The race was normally held in late September or early October. The race marked the last time a race winner finished at least a lap ahead of the rest of the field (1994, Geoff Bodine won by one lap over Terry Labonte).

Past winners

1954: Race shortened due to crash.
1988: The race was originally scheduled for October 2, but two consecutive days of rain caused it to be rescheduled for October 16.

Multiple winners (drivers)

Multiple winners (manufacturers)

References

External links
 

Former NASCAR races
NASCAR races at North Wilkesboro Speedway